The Royal Palm Handicap was a Thoroughbred race for horses age three and older raced between 1946 and 2001 at Hialeah Park Race Track in Hialeah, Florida. It was raced on dirt from inception in 1946 to 1976 after which it was run on the grass course with the exceptions of 1986 and 1997 when, for safety concerns due to the effects of inclement weather, the race was shifted to the main dirt track.

Historical notes
The inaugural running of the Royal Palm took place on January 23, 1946 and was won by the four-year-old gelding Concordian. Owned by Barney Murphy, trained by Robert Odom and ridden by Joe Renick, they would soon follow up with another win in Hialeah's McLennan Handicap.  

Three Rings won this race in three consecutive years from 1949 through 1951. Retired with earnings of $297,077, Three Rings had been purchased for $7,500 by Evelyn L. Hopkins of Cleveland, Ohio from his breeder/owner John Phipps at a June 17, 1948 sale at Aqueduct Racetrack.

There was no race in 1977 and on its return on January 21, 1978 the Royal Palm became a race on turf.

The 1988 Royal Palm Handicap was run on December 5, 1987.

In the March 26, 1995 edition, D J's Rainbow and Gone For Real raced to a dead heat win.

The Royal Palm Handicap had its final running on opening day March 17, 2001 when Hialeah Park was celebrating its 75th anniversary. Hall of Fame jockey Jerry Bailey rode Del Mar Show to victory for Hall of Fame trainer Bill Mott.

Records
Speed record:
 1:39.60 @ 1-1/16 miles: Social Retiree (1994)
 1:48.20 @ 1-1/8 miles: Hitting Away (1962)

Most wins:
 3 - Three Rings (1949, 1950, 1951)

Most wins by a jockey:
 4 - Jerry Bailey (1978, 1983, 1984, 2001)

Most wins by a trainer:
 3 - William J. Knapp (1949, 1950, 1951)

Most wins by an owner:
 3 - Evelyn L. Hopkins (1949, 1950, 1951)
 3 - Ogden Phipps (1962, 1963, 1964)

Winners

References

Discontinued horse races
Open mile category horse races
Previously graded stakes races in the United States
Turf races in the United States
Horse races in Florida
Hialeah Park
Recurring sporting events established in 1946
Recurring sporting events disestablished in 2002